In Greek mythology, Comaetho (Ancient Greek: Κομαιθώ Komaithṓ means "bright-haired") is a name that may refer to:

Comaetho, a nymph of a spring who incessantly mingles her waters with those of the river god Cydnus, who in one passage of Nonnus' Dionysiaca is said to be her father, and in another her consort.
Comaetho, a beautiful girl of Patrae who served as priestess in the temple of Artemis Triclaria and was in love with Melanippus. They were not allowed to marry each other, so they met secretly in the temple and had sex together. The outraged goddess sent famine and plague upon the city; to propitiate her, the inhabitants had to sacrifice both Comaetho and Melanippus to her. Since then, a young man and a young girl were sacrificed to the goddess each year until, in accordance with the instructions of the Delphian oracle, a strange king (Eurypylus, son of Euaemon) introduced the worship of a new deity (Dionysus, whose image he brought from Troy) in Patrae, thus both putting an end to the sacrifices and curing himself of madness which had been sent upon him when he had first looked at the god's image.
Comaetho, the daughter of Pterelaos and princess of the Taphians. The Taphians were at war with Thebes, led by Amphitryon, with whom Comaetho fell in love. Having defeated the enemy, Amphitryon put Comaetho to death in retribution for her deed of filial perfidy and handed over the kingdom of the Taphians to Cephalus. The story is parallel to that of Scylla (princess); compare also Pisidice and Leucophrye.
Comaetho, daughter of Tydeus and sister of Diomedes, mother of Cyanippus by Aegialeus.

Notes

References 

 Apollodorus, The Library with an English Translation by Sir James George Frazer, F.B.A., F.R.S. in 2 Volumes, Cambridge, MA, Harvard University Press; London, William Heinemann Ltd. 1921. . Online version at the Perseus Digital Library. Greek text available from the same website.
Nonnus of Panopolis, Dionysiaca translated by William Henry Denham Rouse (1863-1950), from the Loeb Classical Library, Cambridge, MA, Harvard University Press, 1940.  Online version at the Topos Text Project.
 Nonnus of Panopolis, Dionysiaca. 3 Vols. W.H.D. Rouse. Cambridge, MA., Harvard University Press; London, William Heinemann, Ltd. 1940–1942. Greek text available at the Perseus Digital Library.
 Pausanias, Description of Greece with an English Translation by W.H.S. Jones, Litt.D., and H.A. Ormerod, M.A., in 4 Volumes. Cambridge, MA, Harvard University Press; London, William Heinemann Ltd. 1918. . Online version at the Perseus Digital Library
Pausanias, Graeciae Descriptio. 3 vols. Leipzig, Teubner. 1903.  Greek text available at the Perseus Digital Library.
 Tryphiodorus, Capture of Troy translated by Mair, A. W. Loeb Classical Library Volume 219. London: William Heinemann Ltd, 1928. Online version at theoi.com
 Tryphiodorus, Capture of Troy with an English Translation by A.W. Mair. London, William Heinemann, Ltd.; New York: G.P. Putnam's Sons. 1928. Greek text available at the Perseus Digital Library.

Naiads
Children of Potamoi
Princesses in Greek mythology
Queens in Greek mythology